Jasonia is a genus of flowering plants in the family Asteraceae.

 Species
 Jasonia longifolia Cass.
 Jasonia radiata Cass.
 Jasonia tuberosa (L.) DC. - France, Spain, Portugal

References

Asteraceae genera
Inuleae